"Truck Yeah" is a song Written by Chris Lucas and Preston Brust of LoCash, Chris Janson, and Danny Myrick and recorded by American country music artist Tim McGraw. It was released on July 3, 2012, as the first single from his 2013 album Two Lanes of Freedom and his first single for Big Machine Records. The release of the single overlapped McGraw's previous single "Right Back Atcha Babe," promoted by Curb Records, due to a rivalry between the two record labels.

Critical reception
Billy Dukes of Taste of Country gave the song four and a half stars out of five, writing that it "isn’t intended to be the smartest song on the radio, but it might be the most fun." Matt Bjorke of Roughstock gave the song four stars out of five, saying that "the swagger of the melody and McGraw's strong delivery of the lyrics" makes it a hit. Ben Foster of Country Universe gave the song a failing grade, writing that "it sounds dumb and ridiculous upon arrival [...] and then it’s all downhill from there."

Music video
The music video was filmed in Chattanooga, Tennessee. It was directed by Chris Hicky and premiered in September 2012.

Track listing
"Truck Yeah" – 3:52
"Truck Yeah (Live)"

Chart performance
"Truck Yeah" debuted at number 22 on the U.S. Billboard Hot Country Songs chart for the week of July 21, 2012, becoming McGraw's highest chart debut ever. It also debuted at number 69 on the U.S. Billboard Hot 100 chart for the week of July 21, 2012. It also debuted at number 52 on the Canadian Hot 100 chart for the week of July 21, 2012.

Year-end charts

Certifications

References

2012 singles
2012 songs
Tim McGraw songs
Song recordings produced by Byron Gallimore
Song recordings produced by Tim McGraw
Music videos directed by Chris Hicky
Big Machine Records singles
Songs written by Chris Janson
Songs written by Danny Myrick